Flindt Landing railway station is located at Flindt Landing in Unorganized Thunder Bay District in northwestern Ontario, Canada. The station is on the Canadian National Railway transcontinental main line between Savant Lake to the west and Harvey to the east; it is used by Via Rail and served by transcontinental Canadian trains.

References

Via Rail stations in Ontario
Railway stations in Thunder Bay District